Prince Rogers Nelson (June 7, 1958April 21, 2016), commonly known mononymously as Prince, was an American singer-songwriter, musician, and record producer. The recipient of numerous awards and nominations, he is widely regarded as one of the greatest musicians of his generation. He was known for his flamboyant, androgynous persona; his wide vocal range, which included a far-reaching falsetto and high-pitched screams; and his skill as a multi-instrumentalist, often preferring to play all or most of the instruments on his recordings. Prince produced his albums himself, pioneering the Minneapolis sound. His music incorporated a wide variety of styles, including funk, R&B, rock, new wave, soul, synth-pop, pop, jazz, and hip hop.

Born and raised in Minneapolis, Prince signed a record deal with Warner Bros. Records at the age of 19, soon releasing the albums For You (1978) and Prince (1979). He went on to achieve critical success with the influential albums Dirty Mind (1980), Controversy (1981), and 1999 (1982). His sixth album, Purple Rain (1984), was recorded with his new backing band the Revolution, and was also the soundtrack to the film of the same name in which he starred. Purple Rain garnered continued success for Prince and was a major commercial achievement, spending six consecutive months atop the Billboard 200 chart. The soundtrack also won Prince the Academy Award for Best Original Song Score. After disbanding the Revolution, Prince released the album Sign o' the Times (1987), widely hailed by critics as the greatest work of his career. In the midst of a contractual dispute with Warner Bros. in 1993, he changed his stage name to the unpronounceable symbol  (known to fans as the "Love Symbol") and was often referred to as The Artist Formerly Known as Prince (or TAFKAP) or simply The Artist.

After signing with Arista Records in 1998, Prince reverted to his original name in 2000. Over the next decade, six of his albums entered the U.S. top 10 charts. In April 2016, at the age of 57, Prince died after accidentally overdosing on fentanyl at his Paisley Park home and recording studio in Chanhassen, Minnesota. He was a prolific musician who released 39 albums during his life, with a vast array of unreleased material left in a custom-built bank vault underneath his home after his death, including fully completed albums and over 50 finished music videos. He also released songs under multiple pseudonyms during his life, as well as writing songs that were made popular after being covered by other musicians, most notably "Nothing Compares 2 U" by Sinéad O'Connor and "Manic Monday" by the Bangles. Estimates of the complete number of songs written by Prince range anywhere from 500 to well over 1,000. Released posthumously, his demo albums Piano and a Microphone 1983 (2018) and Originals (2019) both received critical acclaim.

Prince sold over 100 million records worldwide, ranking him among the best-selling music artists of all time. His awards included the Grammy President's Merit Award, the American Music Awards for Achievement and of Merit, the Billboard Icon Award, an Academy Award, and a Golden Globe Award. He was inducted into the Rock and Roll Hall of Fame in 2004, the UK Music Hall of Fame in 2006, and the Rhythm and Blues Music Hall of Fame in 2016, and was inducted twice into the Black Music & Entertainment Walk of Fame in 2022.

Early life 
Prince Rogers Nelson was born in Minneapolis on June 7, 1958, the son of jazz singer Mattie Della (née Shaw) and pianist and songwriter John Lewis Nelson. All four of his grandparents were from Louisiana. His grand-aunt was the black nationalist Mittie Maude Lena Gordon, who established the Peace Movement of Ethiopia and advocated emigration to West Africa in response to American white supremacy. The jazz drummer Louis Hayes was his paternal cousin.

Prince was named after his father's most popular stage name, Prince Rogers, which his father used while performing with Prince's mother in a jazz group called the Prince Rogers Trio. In 1991, Prince's father told A Current Affair that he named his son "Prince" because he wanted Prince "to do everything I wanted to do". Prince was not fond of his name and wanted people to instead call him "Skipper", a name which stuck throughout his childhood. Prince said he was "born epileptic" and had seizures when he was young. He stated, "My mother told me one day I walked in to her and said, 'Mom, I'm not going to be sick anymore,' and she said, 'Why?' and I said, 'Because an angel told me so.'" Prince's younger sister, Tyka, was born on May 18, 1960. Both siblings developed a keen interest in music, which was encouraged by their father. His parents were both members of the Seventh-day Adventist Church, an evangelical denomination.

In 2022, during a Minneapolis teachers' strike, Minneapolis news station WCCO-TV was researching a previous teacher's strike in 1970 and accidentally uncovered an interview they had done with Prince about the 1970 strike. Prince, who was 11 or 12 years old at the time, said about the strike, "I think they should get a better education too cause, um, and I think they should get some more money cause they work, they be working extra hours for us and all that stuff." While he never identifies himself in the interview, it was confirmed to be him through interviews with a historian in Minneapolis who is also a fan of Prince, as well as by a former classmate who was a member of Prince's first band. The video is one of very few videos of Prince from that stage of his life.

Prince wrote his first song, "Funk Machine", on his father's piano when he was seven years old. His parents divorced when he was 10. His mother remarried to Hayward Baker, with whom she had a son named Omarr; Prince had a fraught relationship with Omarr, to the extent that it caused him to repeatedly switch homes, sometimes living with his father and sometimes with his mother and stepfather. Baker took Prince to see James Brown in concert, and Prince credited Baker with improving the family's finances. After a brief period of living with his father, who bought him his first guitar, Prince moved into the basement of his neighbors, the Anderson family, after his father threw him out. He befriended the Andersons' son, Andre, who later collaborated with Prince and became known as André Cymone.

Prince attended Minneapolis' Bryant Junior High and then Central High School, where he played football, basketball, and baseball. He played on Central's junior varsity basketball team, and continued to play basketball for fun as an adult. While attending Bryant, he was trained in classical ballet at the Minnesota Dance Theatre through the Urban Arts Program of Minneapolis Public Schools. He grew to become an advocate for dancers, and would later use his wealth to save the failing Joffrey Ballet in Chicago during the 1990s. He met songwriter and producer Jimmy Jam in 1973 and impressed Jam with his musical talent, early mastery of a wide range of instruments, and work ethic.

Career

1975–1984: Beginnings and breakthrough 

In 1975, Pepe Willie (the husband of Prince's cousin Shauntel), formed the band 94 East with Marcy Ingvoldstad and Kristie Lazenberry, hiring André Cymone and Prince to record tracks. Willie wrote the songs, and Prince contributed guitar tracks, and Prince and Willie co-wrote the 94 East song, "Just Another Sucker". The band recorded tracks which later became the album Minneapolis Genius – The Historic 1977 Recordings. In 1976, shortly after graduating from Central High School, Prince created a demo tape with producer Chris Moon, in Moon's Minneapolis studio. Unable to secure a recording contract, Moon brought the tape to Owen Husney, a Minneapolis businessman, who signed Prince, age 19, to a management contract, and helped him create a demo at Sound 80 Studios in Minneapolis (with producer/engineer David Z). The demo recording, along with a press kit produced at Husney's ad agency, resulted in interest from several record companies, including Warner Bros. Records, A&M Records, and Columbia Records.

With the help of Husney, Prince signed a recording contract with Warner Bros. The record company agreed to give Prince creative control for three albums and retain his publishing rights. Husney and Prince then left Minneapolis and moved to Sausalito, California, where Prince's first album, For You, was recorded at Record Plant Studios. The album was mixed in Los Angeles and released on April 7, 1978. According to the For You album notes, Prince wrote, produced, arranged, composed, and played all 27 instruments on the recording, except for the song "Soft and Wet", whose lyrics were co-written by Moon. The cost of recording the album was twice Prince's initial advance. Prince used the Prince's Music Co. to publish his songs. "Soft and Wet" reached No. 12 on the Hot Soul Singles chart and No. 92 on the Billboard Hot 100. The song "Just as Long as We're Together" reached No. 91 on the Hot Soul Singles chart.

In 1979, Prince created a band with André Cymone on bass, Dez Dickerson on guitar, Gayle Chapman and Doctor Fink on keyboards, and Bobby Z. on drums. Their first show was at the Capri Theater on January 5, 1979. Warner Bros. executives attended the show but decided that Prince and the band needed more time to develop his music. In October 1979, Prince released the album Prince, which was No. 4 on the Billboard Top R&B/Black Albums charts and No. 22 on the Billboard 200, and went platinum. It contained two R&B hits: "Why You Wanna Treat Me So Bad?" and "I Wanna Be Your Lover", which sold over a million copies, and reached No. 11 on the Billboard Hot 100 and No. 1 for two weeks on the Hot Soul Singles chart. Prince performed both these songs on January 26, 1980, on American Bandstand. On this album, Prince used Ecnirp Music – BMI.

In 1980, Prince released the album Dirty Mind, which contained sexually explicit material, including the title song, "Head", and the song "Sister", and was described by Stephen Thomas Erlewine as a "stunning, audacious amalgam of funk, new wave, R&B, and pop, fueled by grinningly salacious sex and the desire to shock". Recorded in Prince's own studio, this album was certified gold, and the single "Uptown" reached No. 5 on the Billboard Dance chart and No. 5 on the Hot Soul Singles chart. Prince was also the opening act for Rick James' 1980 Fire It Up tour.

In February 1981, Prince made his first appearance on Saturday Night Live, performing "Partyup". In October 1981, Prince released the album Controversy. He played several dates in support of it, as the first of three opening acts for the Rolling Stones, on their US tour. In Los Angeles, Prince, who appeared in a trench coat and black bikini briefs, was forced off the stage after just three songs by audience members throwing trash at him. He began 1982 with a small tour of college towns where he was the headlining act. The songs on Controversy were published by Controversy Music – ASCAP, a practice he continued until the Emancipation album in 1996. Controversy also marked the introduction of Prince's use of abbreviated spelling, such as writing the words you as U, to as 2, and for as 4; by 2002, MTV News noted that "[n]ow all of his titles, liner notes, and Web postings are written in his own shorthand spelling, as seen on 1999's Rave Un2 the Joy Fantastic, which featured 'Hot Wit U.'"

In 1981, Prince formed a side project band called The Time. The band released four albums between 1981 and 1990, with Prince writing and performing most of the instrumentation and backing vocals (sometimes credited under the pseudonyms "Jamie Starr" or "The Starr Company"), with lead vocals by Morris Day. In late 1982, Prince released a double album, 1999, which sold over four million copies. The title track was a protest against nuclear proliferation and became Prince's first top 10 hit in countries outside the US. Prince's "Little Red Corvette" was one of the first two videos by black artists (along with Michael Jackson's "Billie Jean") played in heavy rotation on MTV, which had been perceived as against "black music" until CBS President Walter Yetnikoff threatened to pull all CBS videos. Prince and Jackson had a competitive rivalry which lasted for many years. The song "Delirious" also placed in the top ten on the Billboard Hot 100 chart. "International Lover" earned Prince his first Grammy Award nomination at the 26th Annual Grammy Awards.

1984–1987: Purple Rain, Around the World in a Day and Parade 
During this period Prince referred to his band as the Revolution. The band's name was also printed, in reverse, on the cover of 1999 inside the letter "I" of the word "Prince". The band consisted of Lisa Coleman and Doctor Fink on keyboards, Bobby Z. on drums, Brown Mark on bass, and Dez Dickerson on guitar. Jill Jones, a backing singer, was also part of the lineup for the 1999 album and tour. Following the 1999 Tour, Dickerson left the group for religious reasons. In the book Possessed: The Rise and Fall of Prince (2003), author Alex Hahn says that Dickerson was reluctant to sign a three-year contract and wanted to pursue other musical ventures. Dickerson was replaced by Coleman's friend Wendy Melvoin. At first the band was used sparsely in the studio, but this gradually changed during 1983.

According to his former manager Bob Cavallo, in the early 1980s Prince required his management to obtain a deal for him to star in a major motion picture, despite the fact that his exposure at that point was limited to several pop and R&B hits, music videos and occasional TV performances. This resulted in the hit film Purple Rain (1984), which starred Prince and was loosely autobiographical, and the eponymous studio album, which was also the soundtrack to the film. The Purple Rain album sold more than 13 million copies in the US and spent 24 consecutive weeks at No. 1 on the Billboard 200 chart. The film won Prince an Academy Award for Best Original Song Score and grossed over $68 million in the US ($ million in  dollars). Songs from the film were hits on pop charts around the world; "When Doves Cry" and "Let's Go Crazy" reached No. 1, and the title track reached No. 2 on the Billboard Hot 100. At one point in 1984, Prince simultaneously had the No. 1 album, single, and film in the US; it was the first time a singer had achieved this feat. The Purple Rain album is ranked 8th in Rolling Stones 500 Greatest Albums of All Time; it is also included on the list of Time magazine's All-Time 100 Albums. The album also produced two of Prince's first three Grammy Awards earned at the 27th Annual Grammy Awards—Best Rock Performance by a Duo or Group with Vocal and Best Score Soundtrack for Visual Media.

In 1984, pop artist Andy Warhol created the painting Orange Prince (1984). Andy Warhol was fascinated by Prince, and ultimately created a total of twelve unique paintings of him in different colorways, all of which were kept in Warhol's personal collection. Four of these paintings are now in the collection of The Andy Warhol Museum in Pittsburgh. In November 1984, Vanity Fair published Warhol's portrait to accompany the article Purple Fame by Tristan Fox, and claimed that Warhol's silkscreen image of Prince with its pop colors captured the recording artist "at the height of his powers". The Vanity Fair article was one of the first global media pieces written as a critical appreciation of the musician, which coincided with the start of the 98-date Purple Rain Tour.

After Tipper Gore heard her 11-year-old daughter Karenna listening to Prince's song "Darling Nikki" (which gained wide notoriety for its sexual lyrics and a reference to masturbation), she founded the Parents Music Resource Center. The center advocated the mandatory use of a warning label ("Parental Advisory: Explicit Lyrics") on the covers of records that have been judged to contain language or lyrical content unsuitable for minors. The recording industry later voluntarily complied with this request.

In 1985, Prince announced that he would discontinue live performances and music videos after the release of his next album. His subsequent recording, Around the World in a Day (1985), held the No. 1 spot on the Billboard 200 for three weeks. From that album, the single "Raspberry Beret" reached No. 2 on the Billboard Hot 100, and "Pop Life" reached No. 7.

In 1986, his album Parade reached No. 3 on the Billboard 200 and No. 2 on the R&B charts. The first single, "Kiss", with the video choreographed by Louis Falco, reached No. 1 on the Billboard Hot 100. (The song was originally written for a side project called Mazarati.) In the same year, the song "Manic Monday", written by Prince and recorded by the Bangles, reached No. 2 on the Hot 100 chart. The album Parade served as the soundtrack for Prince's second film, Under the Cherry Moon (1986). Prince directed and starred in the movie, which also featured Kristin Scott Thomas. Although the Parade album went platinum and sold two million copies, the film Under the Cherry Moon received a Golden Raspberry Award for Worst Picture (tied with Howard the Duck), and Prince received Golden Raspberry Awards for Worst Director, Worst Actor, and Worst Original Song (for the song "Love or Money").

In 1986, Prince began a series of live performances called the Hit n Run – Parade Tour. After the tour Prince disbanded the Revolution and fired Wendy & Lisa. Brown Mark quit the band; keyboardist Doctor Fink remained. Prince recruited new band members Miko Weaver on guitar, Atlanta Bliss on trumpet, and Eric Leeds on saxophone.

1987–1991: Sign o' the Times, Lovesexy, Batman and Graffiti Bridge 
Prior to the disbanding of the Revolution, Prince was working on two separate projects, the Revolution album Dream Factory and a solo effort, Camille. Unlike the three previous band albums, Dream Factory included input from the band members and featured songs with lead vocals by Wendy & Lisa. The Camille project saw Prince create a new androgynous persona primarily singing in a sped-up, female-sounding voice. With the dismissal of the Revolution, Prince consolidated material from both shelved albums, along with some new songs, into a three-LP album to be titled Crystal Ball. Warner Bros. forced Prince to trim the triple album to a double album, and Sign o' the Times was released on March 31, 1987.

The album peaked at No. 6 on the Billboard 200 albums chart. The first single, "Sign o' the Times", charted at No. 3 on the Hot 100. The follow-up single, "If I Was Your Girlfriend", charted at No. 67 on the Hot 100 but went to No. 12 on R&B chart. The third single, a duet with Sheena Easton, "U Got the Look", charted at No. 2 on the Hot 100 and No. 11 on the R&B chart, and the final single, "I Could Never Take the Place of Your Man", finished at No. 10 on Hot 100 and No. 14 on the R&B chart.

It was named the top album of the year by the Pazz & Jop critics' poll and sold 3.2 million copies. In Europe, it performed well, and Prince promoted the album overseas with a lengthy tour. Putting together a new backing band from the remnants of the Revolution, Prince added bassist Levi Seacer Jr., keyboardist Boni Boyer, and dancer/choreographer Cat Glover to go with new drummer Sheila E and holdovers Miko Weaver, Doctor Fink, Eric Leeds, Atlanta Bliss, and the Bodyguards (Jerome, Wally Safford, and Greg Brooks) for the Sign o' the Times Tour.

The Sign o' the Times tour was a success overseas, with Warner Bros. and Prince's managers wanting to bring it to the US to promote sales of the album. Prince balked at a full US tour, as he was ready to produce a new album. As a compromise, the last two nights of the tour were filmed for release in movie theaters. The film quality was deemed subpar, and reshoots were performed at Prince's Paisley Park studios. The film Sign o' the Times was released on November 20, 1987. The film got better reviews than Under the Cherry Moon, but its box-office receipts were minimal, and it quickly left theaters.

The next album intended for release was The Black Album. More instrumental and funk- and R&B-themed than recent releases, The Black Album also saw Prince experiment with hip hop on the songs "Bob George" and "Dead on It". Prince was set to release the album with a monochromatic black cover with only the catalog number printed, but after 500,000 copies had been pressed, Prince had a spiritual epiphany that the album was evil and had it recalled. It was later released by Warner Bros. as a limited edition album in 1994.

Prince went back in the studio for eight weeks and recorded Lovesexy. Released on May 10, 1988, Lovesexy serves as a spiritual opposite to the dark The Black Album. Every song is a solo effort by Prince, except "Eye No", which was recorded with his backing band at the time. Lovesexy reached No. 11 on the Billboard 200 and No. 5 on the R&B albums chart. The lead single, "Alphabet St.", peaked at No. 8 on the Hot 100 and No. 3 on the R&B chart; it sold 750,000 copies.

Prince again took his post-Revolution backing band (minus the Bodyguards) on a three-leg, 84-show Lovesexy World Tour; although the shows were well-received by huge crowds, they failed to make a net profit due to the expensive sets and props.

In 1989, Prince appeared on Madonna's studio album Like a Prayer, co-writing and singing the duet "Love Song" and playing electric guitar (uncredited) on the songs "Like a Prayer", "Keep It Together", and "Act of Contrition". He also began work on several musical projects, including Rave Unto the Joy Fantastic and early drafts of his Graffiti Bridge film, but both were put on hold when he was asked by Batman (1989) director Tim Burton to record several songs for the upcoming live-action adaptation. Prince went into the studio and produced an entire nine-track album that Warner Bros. released on June 20, 1989. Batman peaked at No. 1 on the Billboard 200, selling 4.3 million copies. The single "Batdance" topped the Billboard Hot 100 and R&B charts.

The single "The Arms of Orion", with Sheena Easton, charted at No. 36, and "Partyman" (also featuring the vocals of Prince's then-girlfriend, nicknamed Anna Fantastic) charted at No. 18 on the Hot 100 and at No. 5 on the R&B chart, while the love ballad "Scandalous!" went to No. 5 on the R&B chart. Prince had to sign away all publishing rights to the songs on the album to Warner Bros. as part of the deal to do the soundtrack.

In 1990, Prince went back on tour with a revamped band for his back-to-basics Nude Tour. With the departures of Boni Boyer, Sheila E., the horns, and Cat, Prince brought in keyboardist Rosie Gaines, drummer Michael Bland, and dancing trio the Game Boyz (Tony M., Kirky J., and Damon Dickson). The European and Japanese tour was a financial success with a short, greatest hits setlist. As the year progressed, Prince finished production on his fourth film, Graffiti Bridge (1990), and the 1990 album of the same name. Initially, Warner Bros. was reluctant to fund the film, but with Prince's assurances it would be a sequel to Purple Rain as well as the involvement of the original members of the Time, the studio greenlit the project. Released on August 20, 1990, the album reached No. 6 on the Billboard 200 and R&B albums chart. The single "Thieves in the Temple" reached No. 6 on the Hot 100 and No. 1 on the R&B chart; "Round and Round" placed at No. 12 on the US charts and No. 2 on the R&B charts. The song featured the teenage Tevin Campbell (who also had a role in the film) on lead vocals. The film, released on November 20, 1990, was a box-office flop, grossing $4.2 million. After the release of the film and album, the last remaining members of the Revolution, Miko Weaver, and Doctor Fink, left Prince's band.

1991–1996: Name change, Diamonds and Pearls and Chaos and Disorder 

1991 began with a performance in Rock in Rio II and marked the debut of Prince's new band, the New Power Generation. With guitarist Miko Weaver and long-time keyboardist Doctor Fink gone, Prince added bass player Sonny T., Tommy Barbarella on keyboards, and a brass section known as the Hornheads to go along with Levi Seacer (taking over on guitar), Rosie Gaines, Michael Bland, and the Game Boyz. With significant input from his band members, Diamonds and Pearls was released on October 1, 1991. Reaching No. 3 on the Billboard 200 album chart, Diamonds and Pearls saw four hit singles released in the United States. "Gett Off" peaked at No. 21 on the Hot 100 and No. 6 on the R&B charts, followed by "Cream", which gave Prince his fifth US No. 1 single. The title track "Diamonds and Pearls" became the album's third single, reaching No. 3 on the Hot 100 and the top spot on the R&B charts. "Money Don't Matter 2 Night" peaked at No. 23 and No. 14 on the Hot 100 and R&B charts respectively.

In 1992, Prince released his 14th studio album, the second to feature the New Power Generation. It bore only an unpronounceable symbol on the cover (later copyrighted as "Love Symbol #2") as its title; the symbol was explained as being a combination of the symbols for male (♂) and female (♀). Warner Bros. wanted "7" to be the first single, but Prince fought to release "My Name Is Prince", as he believed its "hip-hoppery" would appeal to the audience that had purchased his previous album. Prince got his way, but "My Name Is Prince" reached No. 36 on the Billboard Hot 100 and No. 23 on the R&B chart. The follow-up single, "Sexy MF", charted at No. 66 on the Hot 100 and No. 76 on the R&B chart. "7" reached No. 7. The album, later referred to as Love Symbol, peaked at No. 5 on the Billboard 200 and went on to sell 2.8 million copies worldwide.

After failed attempts in 1990 and 1991, Warner Bros. released a greatest hits compilation with the three-disc The Hits/The B-Sides in 1993. The first two discs were also sold separately as The Hits 1 and The Hits 2. The collection features the majority of Prince's hit singles (with the exception of "Batdance" and other songs that appeared on the Batman soundtrack), and several previously hard-to-find recordings, including B-sides from across Prince's career and previously unreleased tracks such as the Revolution-recorded "Power Fantastic" and a live recording of "Nothing Compares 2 U" with Rosie Gaines. Two new songs, "Pink Cashmere" and "Peach", were chosen as promotional singles.

In 1993, in rebellion against Warner Bros., which refused to release Prince's enormous backlog of music at a steady pace, Prince formally adopted the "Love Symbol" as his stage name. To use the symbol in print media, Warner Bros. organized a mass mailing of floppy disks with a custom font. At this time, Prince was often referred to as "the Artist Formerly Known as Prince" or "the Artist".

In 1994, Prince began to release albums in quick succession as a means of releasing himself from his contractual obligations to Warner Bros. He also began appearing with the word "slave" written on his face. He believed Warner Bros. was intent on limiting his artistic freedom by insisting he release albums more sporadically. He also blamed Warner Bros. for the poor commercial performance of Love Symbol, claiming they had marketed it insufficiently. It was out of these developments that the aborted The Black Album was officially released, seven years after its initial recording. The "new" release was already in wide circulation as a bootleg. Warner Bros. then succumbed to Prince's wishes to release an album of new material, Come.

Prince pushed to have his next album, The Gold Experience, released simultaneously with Love Symbol–era material. Warner Bros. allowed the single "The Most Beautiful Girl in the World" to be released via a small, independent distributor, Bellmark Records, in February 1994. The release reached No. 3 on the US Billboard Hot 100 and No. 1 in many other countries, but it did not prove to be a model for subsequent releases. Warner Bros. still resisted releasing The Gold Experience, fearing poor sales and citing "market saturation" as a defense. When released in September 1995, The Gold Experience reached the top 10 of the Billboard 200 initially. The album is not currently in print due to an ongoing plagiarism case relating to "The Most Beautiful Girl in the World" outlined below, with digital distributors excluding the song in question from the album.

An Italian court ruled in 2003 that "The Most Beautiful Girl in the World" plagiarized the song "Takin' Me to Paradise" by Bruno Bergonzi and Michele Vicino. Bergonzi and Vicino won on appeal in 2007. The third and final sentence, by the Court of Cassation of Rome, was dated May 2015, although the international case is ongoing. Italian collecting society SIAE recognizes Bergonzi and Vicino as the authors of the music for "The Most Beautiful Girl in the World".

Chaos and Disorder, released in 1996, was Prince's final album of new material for Warner Bros., as well as one of his least commercially successful releases.

1996–2000: Emancipation, Crystal Ball and Rave Un2 the Joy Fantastic 
Free of any further contractual obligations to Warner Bros., Prince attempted a major comeback later that year with the release of Emancipation, a 36-song, 3-CD set (each disc was exactly 60 minutes long). The album was released via his own NPG Records with distribution through EMI. To publish his songs on Emancipation, Prince did not use Controversy Music – ASCAP, which he had used for all his records since 1981, but rather used Emancipated Music Inc. – ASCAP.

Emancipation was certified Platinum by the RIAA. It is the first Prince record featuring covers of other artists' songs: Joan Osborne's top ten hit song of 1995 "One of Us"; "Betcha by Golly Wow!" (written by Thom Bell and Linda Creed); "I Can't Make You Love Me" (written by James Allen Shamblin II and Michael Barry Reid); and "La-La (Means I Love You)" (written by Thom Bell and William Hart).

Prince released Crystal Ball, a five-CD collection of unreleased material, in 1998. The distribution of this album was disorderly, with some fans pre-ordering the album on his website up to a year before it was shipped; these pre-orders were delivered months after the record had gone on sale in retail stores. The retail edition has only four discs, as it is missing the Kamasutra disc. There are also two different packaging editions for retail; one is a four-disc sized jewel case with a white cover and the Love Symbol in a colored circle while the other contains all four discs in a round translucent snap jewel case. The discs are the same, as is the CD jacket. The Newpower Soul album was released three months later. His collaborations on Chaka Khan's Come 2 My House and Larry Graham's GCS2000, both released on the NPG Records label around the same time as Newpower Soul, were promoted by live appearances on Vibe with Sinbad and the NBC Today show's Summer Concert Series.

In 1999, Prince once again signed with a major label, Arista Records, to release a new record, Rave Un2 the Joy Fantastic. A few months earlier, Warner Bros. had also released The Vault: Old Friends 4 Sale, a collection of unreleased material recorded by Prince throughout his career.

The pay-per-view concert, Rave Un2 the Year 2000, was broadcast on December 31, 1999, and consisted of footage from the December 17 and 18 concerts of his 1999 tour. The concert featured appearances by guest musicians, including Lenny Kravitz, George Clinton, Jimmy Russell, and The Time. It was released to home video the following year.

2000–2007: Musicology and 3121  
On May 16, 2000, Prince stopped using the Love Symbol as his name, since his publishing contract with Warner/Chappell had expired. In a press conference, he stated that after being freed from undesirable relationships associated with the name "Prince", he would revert to using his real name. Nevertheless, Prince continued to use the symbol as a logo and on album artwork and to play a Love Symbol–shaped guitar. For several years following the release of Rave Un2 the Joy Fantastic, Prince primarily released new music through his Internet subscription service, NPGOnlineLtd.com, which later became NPGMusicClub.com. Albums from this period are Rave In2 the Joy Fantastic (2001), The Rainbow Children (2001), One Nite Alone... (2002), Xpectation (2003), C-Note (2004), The Chocolate Invasion (2004) and The Slaughterhouse (2004).

In 2001, Warner Bros. released a second compilation album, The Very Best of Prince, containing most of his commercially successful singles from the eighties. In 2002, Prince released his first live album, One Nite Alone... Live!, which features performances from the One Nite Alone...Tour. The 3-CD box set also includes a disc of "aftershow" music entitled It Ain't Over!. During this time, Prince sought to engage more effectively with his fan base via the NPG Music Club, pre-concert sound checks, and at yearly "celebrations" at Paisley Park, his music studios. Fans were invited into the studio for tours, interviews, discussions and music-listening sessions. Some of these fan discussions were filmed for an unreleased documentary, directed by Kevin Smith.

On February 8, 2004, Prince appeared at the 46th Annual Grammy Awards with Beyoncé. In a performance that opened the show, they performed a medley of "Purple Rain", "Let's Go Crazy", "Baby I'm a Star", and Beyoncé's "Crazy in Love". The following month, Prince was inducted into the Rock and Roll Hall of Fame. The award was presented to him by Alicia Keys along with Big Boi and André 3000 of OutKast. As well as performing a trio of his own hits during the ceremony, Prince also participated in a tribute to fellow inductee George Harrison in a rendering of Harrison's "While My Guitar Gently Weeps", playing a two-minute guitar solo that ended the song. He also performed the song "Red House" as "Purple House" on the album Power of Soul: A Tribute to Jimi Hendrix.

In April 2004, Prince released Musicology through a one-album agreement with Columbia Records. The album rose as high as the top five on some international charts (including the US, UK, Germany, and Australia). The US chart success was assisted by the CDs being included as part of the concert ticket purchase, thereby qualifying each CD (as chart rules then stood) to count toward US chart placement. Three months later, Spin named him the greatest frontman of all time. That same year, Rolling Stone magazine named Prince as the highest-earning musician in the world, with an annual income of $56.5 million, largely due to his Musicology Tour, which Pollstar named as the top concert draw among musicians in the US. He played 96 concerts; the average ticket price for a show was US$61. Musicology went on to receive two Grammy wins, for Best Male R&B Vocal Performance for "Call My Name" and Best Traditional R&B Vocal Performance for the title track. Musicology was also nominated for Best R&B Song and Best R&B Album, and "Cinnamon Girl" was nominated for Best Male Pop Vocal Performance. Rolling Stone ranked Prince No. 27 on their list of the 100 Greatest Artists of All Time.

In April 2005, Prince played guitar (along with En Vogue singing backing vocals) on Stevie Wonder's single "So What the Fuss", Wonder's first since 1999. In late 2005, Prince signed with Universal Music to release his album, 3121, on March 21, 2006. The first single was "Te Amo Corazón", the video for which was directed by actress Salma Hayek and filmed in Marrakech, Morocco, featuring Argentine actress and singer Mía Maestro. The video for the second single, "Black Sweat", was nominated at the MTV VMAs for Best Cinematography. The immediate success of 3121 gave Prince his first No. 1 debut on the Billboard 200 with the album.

To promote the new album, Prince was the musical guest on Saturday Night Live on February 4, 2006, 17 years after his last SNL appearance on the 15th anniversary special, and nearly 25 years since his first appearance on a regular episode in 1981. At the 2006 Webby Awards on June 12, Prince received a Webby Lifetime Achievement Award in recognition of his "visionary use of the Internet to distribute music and connect with audiences", exemplified by his decision to release his album Crystal Ball (1998) exclusively online.

In July 2006, weeks after winning a Webby Award, Prince shut down his NPG Music Club website, after more than five years of operation. On the day of the music club's shutdown, a lawsuit was filed against Prince by the British company HM Publishing (owners of the Nature Publishing Group, also NPG). Despite these events occurring on the same day, Prince's attorney stated that the site did not close due to the trademark dispute.

Prince appeared at multiple award ceremonies in 2006: on February 15, he performed at the 2006 Brit Awards, along with Wendy & Lisa and Sheila E., and on June 27, Prince appeared at the 2006 BET Awards, where he was awarded Best Male R&B Artist. Prince performed a medley of Chaka Khan songs for Khan's BET Lifetime Achievement Award. In 2006, he was invited to dub the Prince XII cat in the film Garfield: A Tail of Two Kitties, but gave up for unknown reasons and was replaced by actor Tim Curry.

In November 2006, Prince was inducted into the UK Music Hall of Fame; he appeared to collect his award but did not perform. Also in November 2006, Prince opened a nightclub called 3121, in Las Vegas at the Rio All Suite Hotel and Casino. He performed weekly on Friday and Saturday nights until April 2007, when his contract with the Rio ended. On August 22, 2006, Prince released Ultimate Prince. The double-disc set contains one CD of previous hits, and another of extended versions and mixes of material that had largely only previously been available on vinyl record B-sides. That same year, Prince wrote and performed a song for the hit animated film Happy Feet (2006). The song, "The Song of the Heart", appears on the film's soundtrack, which also features a cover of Prince's earlier hit "Kiss", sung by Nicole Kidman and Hugh Jackman. In January 2007, "The Song of the Heart" won a Golden Globe for Best Original Song.

2007–2010: Super Bowl XLI show, Planet Earth and Lotusflower 

On February 4, 2007, Prince played at the Super Bowl XLI halftime show in Miami, Florida on a large stage shaped like his symbol. The event was carried to 140 million television viewers, his biggest ever audience. His 12 minute performance in the rain began with an intro of the Queen song "We Will Rock You" and concluded with "Purple Rain". In 2015, Billboard ranked it the greatest Super Bowl performance ever.

Prince played 21 concerts at the O2 Arena in London during the Earth Tour in mid-2007. Tickets for the 20,000 capacity venue were capped by Prince at £31.21 ($48.66). Featuring Maceo Parker in his band, Prince's residency at the O2 Arena was increased to 15 nights after all 140,000 tickets for the original seven sold out in 20 minutes, before it was then further extended to 21 nights.

Prince performed with Sheila E. at the 2007 ALMA Awards. On June 28, 2007, the Mail on Sunday stated that it had made a deal to give Prince's new album, Planet Earth, away for free with the paper, making it the first place in the world to get the album. This move sparked controversy among music distributors and also led the UK arm of Prince's distributor, Sony BMG, to withdraw from distributing the album in UK stores. The UK's largest high street music retailer, HMV, stocked the paper on release day due to the giveaway. On July 7, 2007, Prince returned to Minneapolis to perform three shows. He performed concerts at the Macy's Auditorium (to promote his new perfume "3121") on Nicollet Mall, the Target Center arena, and First Avenue. It was the first time he had played at First Avenue (the club appeared in the film Purple Rain) since 1987.

From 2008, Prince was managed by UK-based Kiran Sharma. On April 25, 2008, Prince performed on The Tonight Show with Jay Leno, where he debuted a new song, "Turn Me Loose". Days after, he headlined the 2008 Coachella Festival. Prince was paid more than $5 million for his performance at Coachella, according to Reuters. Prince canceled a concert, planned at Dublin's Croke Park on June 16, 2008, at 10 days' notice. In October 2009 promoters MCD Productions went to court to sue him for €1.6 million to refund 55,126 tickets. Prince settled the case out of court in February 2010 for $2.95 million. During the trial, it was said that Prince had been offered $22 million for seven concerts as part of a proposed 2008 European tour. In October 2008, Prince released a live album entitled Indigo Nights, a collection of songs performed live at aftershows in the IndigO2.

Prince premiered four songs from his new album on LA's Indie rock radio station Indie 103.1 on December 18, 2008. The radio station's programmers Max Tolkoff and Mark Sovel had been invited to Prince's home to hear the new rock-oriented music. Prince gave them a CD with four songs to premiere on their radio station. The music debuted the next day on Jonesy's Jukebox, hosted by former Sex Pistol Steve Jones.

On January 3, 2009, the new website LotusFlow3r.com was launched; streaming and selling some of the recently aired material and concert tickets. On January 31, Prince released two more songs on LotusFlow3r.com: "Disco Jellyfish", and "Another Boy". "Chocolate Box", "Colonized Mind", and "All This Love" were later released on the website. Prince released a triple album set containing Lotusflower, MPLSoUND, and an album credited to Bria Valente, called Elixer, on March 24, 2009, followed by a physical release on March 29.

On July 18, 2009, Prince performed two shows at the Montreux Jazz Festival, backed by the New Power Generation, including Rhonda Smith, Renato Neto and John Blackwell. On October 11, 2009, he gave two surprise concerts at the Grand Palais. On October 12, he gave another surprise performance at La Cigale. On October 24, Prince played a concert at Paisley Park.

2010–2016: Final albums 
In January 2010, Prince wrote a new song, "Purple and Gold", inspired by his visit to a Minnesota Vikings football game against the Dallas Cowboys. The following month, he let Minneapolis-area public radio station 89.3 The Current premiere his new song "Cause and Effect" as a gesture in support of independent radio.

In 2010, Prince was listed in Times annual ranking of the "100 Most Influential People in the World". He released a new single on Minneapolis radio station 89.3 The Current called "Hot Summer" on June 7, his 52nd birthday. The same month, Prince appeared on the cover of the July 2010 issue of Ebony, and he received the Lifetime Achievement Award at the 2010 BET Awards.

Prince released his album 20Ten in July 2010 as a free covermount with publications in the UK, Belgium, Germany, and France. He refused album access to digital download services and closed LotusFlow3r.com. On July 4, 2010, Prince began his 20Ten Tour, a concert tour in two legs, with shows in Europe. The second leg began on October 15 and ended with a concert following the Abu Dhabi Grand Prix on November 14. The second half of the tour had a new band, John Blackwell, Ida Kristine Nielsen, and Sheila E. Prince let Europe 1 debut the snippet of his new song "Rich Friends" from the new album 20Ten Deluxe on October 8, 2010. He embarked on the Welcome 2 Tour on December 15, 2010. Prince was inducted into the Grammy Hall of Fame on December 7, 2010.

Prince presented Barbra Streisand with an award and donated $1.5 million to charities on February 12, 2011. On the same day, it was reported that he had not authorized the television show Glee to cover his hit "Kiss", in an episode that had already been filmed. Prince headlined the Hop Farm Festival on July 3, 2011, marking his first UK show since 2007 and his first-ever UK festival appearance. Despite having previously rejected the Internet for music distribution, on November 24, 2011, he released a reworked version of the previously unreleased song "Extraloveable" through both iTunes and Spotify. Purple Music, a Switzerland-based record label, released a CD single "Dance 4 Me" on December 12, 2011, as part of a club remixes package including the Bria Valente CD single "2 Nite" released on February 23, 2012. The CD features club remixes by Jamie Lewis and David Alexander, produced by Prince.

In January 2013, Prince released a lyric video for a new song called "Screwdriver". In April 2013, Prince announced a West Coast tour titled Live Out Loud Tour with 3rdeyegirl as his backing band. The final two dates of the first leg of the tour were in Minneapolis where former Revolution drummer Bobby Z. sat in as guest drummer on both shows. In May, Prince announced a deal with Kobalt Music to market and distribute his music. On August 14, 2013, Prince released a new solo single for download through the 3rdeyegirl.com website. The single "Breakfast Can Wait" had cover art featuring comedian Dave Chappelle's impersonation of him, from a 2004 second-season Chappelle's Show comedy sketch on Comedy Central.

In February 2014, he performed concerts with 3rdeyegirl in London titled the Hit and Run Tour. Beginning with intimate shows, the first was held at the London home of singer Lianne La Havas, followed by two performances of what Prince described as a "sound check" at the Electric Ballroom in Camden, and another at Shepherd's Bush Empire. On April 18, 2014, Prince released a new single entitled "The Breakdown". He re-signed with his former label, Warner Bros. Records after an 18-year split. Warner announced that Prince would release a remastered deluxe edition of Purple Rain in 2014 to celebrate the 30th anniversary of the album. In return, Warner gave Prince ownership of the master recordings of his recordings with the company.

In February 2014, Prince began what was billed as his 'Hit N Run Part One' tour. This involved Prince's Twitter followers keeping an avid eye on second-by-second information as to the whereabouts of his shows. Many of these shows would only be announced on the day of the concert, and many of these concerts involved two performances: a matinee and an evening show. These shows began at Camden's Electric Ballroom, billed as 'Soundchecks', and spread throughout the UK capital to KoKo Club, in Camden, Shepherd's Bush Empire and various other small venues. After his London dates, he moved on to other European cities. In May 2014, Prince began his 'Hit N Run Part Two' shows, which followed a more normal style of purchasing tickets online and being held in music arenas. In Spring 2014, he launched NPG Publishing, a music company to administer his own music and that of other artists without the restrictions of mainstream record companies.

In May 2015, following the death of Freddie Gray and the subsequent riots, Prince released a song, "Baltimore", in tribute to Gray and in support of the protesters in that city. He also held a tribute concert for Gray at his Paisley Park estate called "Dance Rally 4 Peace" in which he encouraged fans to wear the color gray in honor of Freddie Gray. On May 10, he performed a special concert at the Royal Farms Arena in Baltimore called "Rally 4 Peace," that featured a special appearance by Baltimore State's Attorney Marilyn Mosby, and one set performed by Prince alone at a keyboard.

Prince's penultimate album, Hit n Run Phase One, was first made available on September 7, 2015, on the music streaming service Tidal before being released on CD and for download on September 14. His final album, Hit n Run Phase Two, was meant as a continuation of this, and was released on Tidal for streaming and download on December 12, 2015. In February 2016, Prince embarked on the Piano & A Microphone Tour, a tour that saw his show stripped back to only him and a custom piano on stage. He performed a series of warm-up shows at Paisley Park in late January 2016 and the tour commenced in Melbourne, Australia, on February 16, 2016, to critical acclaim. The Australian and New Zealand legs of the tour were played in small-capacity venues, including the Sydney Opera House. Hit n Run Phase Two CDs were distributed to every attendee after each performance. The tour continued to the United States but was cut abruptly short by illness in April 2016.

Illness and death 

Prince saw Michael T. Schulenberg, a Twin Cities specialist in family medicine, in Excelsior on April 7, 2016, and again on April 20. On April 7, he postponed two performances at the Fox Theatre in Atlanta from his Piano & a Microphone Tour; the venue released a statement saying he had influenza. He rescheduled and performed what was to be his final show on April 14, despite still not feeling well. While flying back to Minneapolis early the next morning, he became unresponsive, and his private jet made an emergency landing at Quad Cities International Airport in Moline, Illinois, where he was hospitalized and received naloxone, a medication used to block the effects of opioids, especially following an overdose. Once he became conscious, he left against medical advice. Representatives said he was dehydrated and had influenza for several weeks. Prince was seen bicycling the next day in his hometown of Chanhassen. He shopped that evening at the Electric Fetus in Minneapolis for Record Store Day and made a brief appearance at an impromptu dance party at his Paisley Park recording studio complex, stating that he was feeling fine. On April 19, he attended a performance by singer Lizz Wright at the Dakota Jazz Club.

On April 20, 2016, Prince's representatives called Howard Kornfeld, a California specialist in addiction medicine and pain management, seeking medical help for the star. Kornfeld scheduled to meet with him on April 22, and he contacted a local physician who cleared his schedule for a physical exam on April 21. On April 21, at 9:43 am, the Carver County Sheriff's Office received a 911 call requesting an ambulance be sent to Prince's home at Paisley Park. The caller initially told the dispatcher that an unidentified person at the home was unconscious, then moments later said he was dead, and finally identified the person as Prince. The caller was Kornfeld's son, who had flown in with buprenorphine that morning to devise a treatment plan for opioid addiction. Emergency responders found Prince unresponsive in an elevator and performed CPR, but a paramedic said he had already been dead for at least six hours, and they were unable to revive him. They pronounced him dead at 10:07 am, 19 minutes after their arrival. There were no signs of suicide or foul play. A press release from the Midwest Medical Examiner's Office in Anoka County on June 2 stated that the musician had died of an accidental overdose of fentanyl, at the age of 57.

The fentanyl that led to his overdose was contained in counterfeit pills made to look like a generic version of the painkiller hydrocodone/paracetamol. The question of how and from what source Prince obtained the drug that led to his death has been the subject of investigations by several law enforcement agencies. A sealed search warrant was issued for his estate, and another unsealed search warrant was issued for the local Walgreens pharmacy. On April 19, 2018, the Carver County Attorney announced that the multi-agency investigation related to the circumstances of the star's death had ended with no criminal charges filed.

Following an autopsy performed by Dr. A. Quinn Strobl, a protege of Janis Amatuzio, his remains were cremated. On April 26, 2016, Prince's sister and only full sibling Tyka Nelson filed court documents in Carver County, to open a probate case, stating that no will had been found. As of his death, the twice-divorced Prince was neither married nor known to have fathered any surviving children. Under Minnesota law, the absence of a will meant that, in addition to his full sister, Prince's five half-siblings also had a claim to an estate totaling millions of dollars in cash as well as real estate, stocks, and cars. Within three weeks of his death, 700 people claimed to be half-siblings or descendants. Bremer Trust was given temporary control of his estate, had his vault drilled open, and was authorized to obtain a blood sample for DNA profiling from the coroner who had performed the autopsy.

Prince's ashes were placed into a custom 3D-printed urn shaped like the Paisley Park estate. The urn was placed on display in the atrium of the Paisley Park complex in October 2016. , no additional estate claimants were recognized by the courts besides Prince's full sister and five half-siblings. It was reported in August 2022 the Prince estate had settled. Filings in the Minnesota First Judicial District ordered that the cash in Prince's estate be split evenly between Prince Legacy LLC and Prince OAT Holdings LLC.

Remembrances and reactions 

Numerous musicians and cultural figures reacted to Prince's death. President Obama mourned him, and the United States Senate passed a resolution praising his achievements "as a musician, composer, innovator, and cultural icon". Cities across the U.S. held tributes and vigils, and lit buildings, bridges, and other structures in purple. In the first five hours after the media reported his death, "Prince" was the top trending (most-used) term on Twitter, and Facebook had 61 million Prince-related interactions. MTV interrupted its programming to air a marathon of Prince music videos and Purple Rain. AMC Theatres and Carmike Cinemas screened Purple Rain in select theaters over the following week. Saturday Night Live aired an episode in his honor, titled "Goodnight, Sweet Prince", featuring his performances from the show.

Nielsen Music reported that sales of his material spiked 42,000 percent. The artist's catalog sold 4.41 million albums and songs from April 21 to 28, with five albums simultaneously in the top ten of the Billboard 200, a first in the chart's history. At the 59th Grammy Awards, Morris Day with the Time and Bruno Mars performed a tribute.

The May 2, 2016, cover of The New Yorker featured an illustration of purple rain. In June 2016 Vanity Fair/Condé Nast, released a special edition commemorative magazine, The Genius of Prince. It celebrated the star's life and achievements, with new photography and archive articles, including the original Vanity Fair article from November 1984, written in the wake of the singer-songwriter's breakout success, with other content from the magazine, The New Yorker, Wired, and Pitchfork. The cover of The Genius of Prince featured a portrait by Andy Warhol, Orange Prince (1984). Casts of the musicals The Color Purple and Hamilton paid tribute to the star during their curtain calls with "Purple Rain" and "Let's Go Crazy", respectively.

In 2016, Minnesota representative Joe Atkins introduced a bill in the state legislature to memorialize Prince with a statue in the National Statuary Hall in the United States Capitol, in recognition of his contributions to music and the state of Minnesota. As of 2020, however, the bill has not had a second reading.

Posthumous projects

2016–2019 
On August 21, 2016, Prince was posthumously inducted into the Rhythm and Blues Music Hall of Fame. The first album released following his death was a greatest hits album, 4Ever, released on November 22, 2016. It contains one previously unreleased song, "Moonbeam Levels", recorded in 1982 during the 1999 sessions.

On February 9, 2017, Prince's estate signed a distribution deal with Universal Music Group, which includes the post-1995 recordings on his NPG Records label and unreleased tracks from his vault. On June 27, Comerica (acting on behalf of the estate) requested that Carver County District Judge Kevin Eide cancel the estate's deal with Universal, as UMG's contract would interfere with a contract with Warner Music Group that Prince signed in 2014. After Universal's attorneys were granted access to the Warner contract, the attorneys also offered to cancel the deal. On July 13, the court voided Universal's deal with Prince's estate, though Universal will continue to administer Prince's songwriting credits and create merchandise.

On April 19, an EP featuring six unreleased Prince recordings, Deliverance, was announced with an expected release date for later that week. The next day, Prince's estate was granted a temporary restraining order against George Ian Boxill, an engineer who co-produced the tracks and was in possession of the master tapes, and halted the release of the EP.

On June 23, Purple Rain was re-released in Deluxe and Deluxe Expanded editions. It is the first Prince album to be remastered and reissued. The Deluxe edition consists of two discs, the first being a remaster of the original album made in 2015 overseen by Prince himself and a bonus disc of previously unreleased songs, called From the Vault & Previously Unreleased. The Deluxe Expanded edition consists of two more discs, a disc with all the single edits, maxi-single edits, and B-sides from the Purple Rain era, and a DVD with a concert from the Purple Rain Tour filmed in Syracuse on March 30, 1985, previously released on home video in 1985. The album debuted at No. 4 on the Billboard 200 and at No. 1 on both the Billboard R&B Albums and Vinyl Albums charts.

On April 19, 2018, the previously unreleased original recording of "Nothing Compares 2 U" from 1984 was released as a single by Warner Bros. Records in conjunction with Prince's estate. In addition, the Prince version was given its own music video, released in conjunction with the single; the video consists of edited rehearsal footage for the Purple Rain tour, shot in the summer of 1984. Troy Carter, adviser for Prince's estate, later announced in an interview with Variety that a full-length album was planned for release on September 28.

In June, the Prince estate signed a distribution deal with Sony Music Entertainment, which includes the rights to all of Prince's studio albums, plus unreleased music, remixes, live recordings, music videos and B-sides from before 1995. The deal will immediately include Prince's albums from 1995 to 2010. Beginning in 2021, Prince's Warner Bros. albums from 1978–1996 will become distributed by Sony/Legacy Recordings in the United States, with Warner Music Group still controlling the international rights.

On July 11, Heritage Auctions announced the auction of Prince's personal possessions to be conducted in Dallas, Texas, on July 21, 2018. A total of 27 items was announced to be put in the auction, including Prince's bible, stage worn clothing, and some personal documents. On August 17, NPG Records released all 23 post-Warner Bros. albums by Prince digitally on streaming platforms, together with a new compilation album Anthology: 1995–2010, containing 37 tracks. On September 21, Piano and a Microphone 1983 was released on CD, vinyl, and digital formats. It is the first album released by the Prince estate with material from his archive, the Vault.

The Sony/Legacy reissues began in February 2019. The first three releases were Musicology, 3121, and Planet Earth on limited edition purple vinyl and standard CD formats. Later that month, the Prince Estate announced reissues of the albums Rave Un2 the Joy Fantastic and Rave In2 the Joy Fantastic on purple vinyl as well as Ultimate Rave, a 2 CD and 1 DVD set which includes Prince In Concert: Rave Un2 the Year 2000. On April 13 (Record Store Day), the cassette The Versace Experience - Prelude 2 Gold, originally issued in 1995 and given as a gift to attendees to the Versace collection at that year's Paris Fashion Week, was reissued in a limited edition.

On June 7, Warner released a new Prince album Originals exclusively through TIDAL. The album contains Prince's original versions of 15 songs he offered to other artists in the past. A wide release on CD and vinyl followed on June 20. On September 13, The Versace Experience was reissued on purple vinyl and CD as well as on digital formats, together with reissues of Chaos and Disorder and Emancipation. On October 18, a single with his acoustic demo of "I Feel for You" was released digitally, alongside a limited edition 7" purple vinyl in honor of the 40th anniversary of the Prince album release. On November 27, 1999 was reissued in Remastered, Deluxe, and Super Deluxe editions, the latter including 35 previously unreleased songs and two live concerts.

2020–present 
On September 25, 2020, The Estate of Prince Rogers Nelson released three editions of Prince's Sign o' the Times Super Deluxe. The Remastered edition contains a remaster of the original album (discs one and two). The Deluxe edition contains the remaster and a third disc with all the single and maxi-single mixes as well as the B-sides. The Super Deluxe edition contains six additional discs: Three of them contain 45 previously unissued studio tracks, two discs contain the live audio concert recordings of the Sign o' the Times Tour at stadium Galgenwaard in Utrecht, The Netherlands, and the last disc is a DVD with the live video concert recordings of the New Year's Eve show at Paisley Park, that has been bootlegged prior to this release. The albums were also issued on vinyl in a 2 LP, 2 LP peach vinyl, 4 LP and 13 LP + DVD set and are available on all digital download and streaming services. The video content is exclusive to the physical DVD and does not appear on digital download or streaming versions of the Super Deluxe Edition set. Pitchfork rated the Super Deluxe version, released on October 2, 2020, 10 out of 10 and named it Best New Reissue.

On April 7, 2021, The Estate of Prince Rogers Nelson announced a vinyl reissue of the 1998 album The Truth for Record Store Day 2021 on June 12. The next day, they announced the forthcoming release of the previously unreleased album Welcome 2 America featuring Tal Wilkenfeld on bass, Chris Coleman on drums, Morris Hayes on keyboards, and vocals from New Power Generation singers Liv Warfield, Shelby J. and Elisa Fiorillo on July 30.

Artistry and legacy

Music and image 
 

Prince is widely regarded as one of the greatest musicians of his generation. Rolling Stone ranked Prince at No. 27 on its list of 100 Greatest Artists, "the most influential artists of the rock & roll era". According to Acclaimed Music, he is the 9th most celebrated artist in popular music history. In 2010, Prince was ranked number 7 on VH1's "100 Greatest Artists of All Time".

In 2003, Rolling Stones 500 Greatest Albums of All Time list included Purple Rain at number 72, Sign o' the Times at number 93, 1999 at number 163, and Dirty Mind at number 204. And in 2004, on their 500 Greatest Songs of All Time list, Rolling Stone included "When Doves Cry" at number 52, "Little Red Corvette" at number 108, "Purple Rain" at number 143, "1999" at number 212, "Sign o' the Times" at number 299, and "Kiss" at number 461.

The Los Angeles Times called Prince "our first post-everything pop star, defying easy categories of race, genre and commercial appeal". Jon Pareles of The New York Times described him as "a master architect of funk, rock, R&B and pop", and highlighted his ability to defy labels, while Geoffrey Himes described him as a leading artist in "a tradition of left-wing black music", or "progressive soul", although even he conceded the term may be "too narrow". Los Angeles Times writer Randall Roberts called Prince "among the most versatile and restlessly experimental pop artists of our time," writing that his "early work connected disco and synthetic funk [while his] fruitful mid-period merged rock, soul, R&B and synth-pop." Simon Reynolds called him a "pop polymath, flitting between funkadelia, acid rock, deep soul, schmaltz—often within the same song". AllMusic wrote that, "With each album he released, Prince showed remarkable stylistic growth and musical diversity, constantly experimenting with different sounds, textures, and genres [...] no other contemporary artist blended so many diverse styles into a cohesive whole." Jon Pareles has named Prince among the "pantheon" of artists in the album era, in which the album format was the dominant form of recorded music expression and consumption.

As a performer, he was known for his flamboyant style and showmanship. He came to be regarded as a sex symbol for his androgynous, amorphous sexuality, play with signifiers of gender, and defiance of racial stereotypes. His "audacious, idiosyncratic" fashion sense made use of "ubiquitous purple, alluring makeup and frilled garments". His androgynous look has been compared to those of Little Richard and David Bowie. In 2016, Reynolds described it as "Prince's '80s evasion of conventional gender definitions speaks to us now in this trans-aware moment. But it also harks backwards in time to the origins of rock 'n' roll in racial mixture and sexual blurring". Prince was known for the strong female presence in his bands and his support for women in the music industry throughout his career. Slate said he worked with an "astounding range of female stars" and "promised a world where men and women looked and acted like each other". Prince also wore high-heeled shoes and boots both on and off-stage.

Many artists have cited Prince as an influence and inspiration, including Beyoncé, Justin Timberlake, Bruno Mars, Rihanna, Alicia Keys, Usher, Janelle Monáe, The Weeknd, Lady Gaga, Lorde, Marilyn Manson, Lenny Kravitz, André 3000, Mark Speer, Jamie Lidell, Frank Ocean and Beck. Bono of U2 regarded Prince as one of his "favorite composers of the twentieth century". Beyoncé expressed her admiration for Prince in the book Prince: A Private View, calling him "my mentor" and also praising his independence: "He dared to fight for what was rightfully his: his freedom, wrapped up in words and music he created."

In August 2017, Pantone Inc. introduced a new shade of purple in their color system in honor of Prince. The shade is called Love Symbol #2.

Influences and musicianship 
Prince's music synthesized a wide variety of influences, and drew inspiration from a range of musicians, including Ike Turner, James Brown, George Clinton, Joni Mitchell, Duke Ellington, Jimi Hendrix, the Beatles, Chuck Berry, David Bowie, Earth, Wind & Fire, Mick Jagger, Rick James, Jerry Lee Lewis, Little Richard, Curtis Mayfield, Elvis Presley, Todd Rundgren, Carlos Santana, Sly Stone, Jackie Wilson, and Stevie Wonder.

Prince has been compared with jazz artist Miles Davis in regard to the artistic changes throughout his career. Davis said he regarded Prince as an otherworldly blend of James Brown, Jimi Hendrix, Marvin Gaye, Sly Stone, Little Richard, Duke Ellington, and Charlie Chaplin. Prince and Miles Davis performed together for a Charity Event at Paisley Park. This performance was viewed as the pinnacle of their on-again, off-again partnership.

Journalist Nik Cohn described him as "rock's greatest ever natural talent". Prince was a natural tenor, but he had a wide vocal range from falsetto to baritone, and performed rapid, seemingly effortless shifts of register. Prince was also renowned as a multi-instrumentalist. He is considered a guitar virtuoso and a master of drums, percussion, bass, keyboards, and synthesizer. On his first five albums, he played nearly all the instruments, including 27 instruments on his debut album, among them various types of bass, keyboards and synthesizers. Prince was also quick to embrace technology in his music, making pioneering use of drum machines like the Linn LM-1 on his early '80s albums and employing a wide range of studio effects. The LA Times also noted his "harnessing [of] new-generation synthesizer sounds in service of the groove," laying the foundations for post-'70s funk music. Prince was also known for his prolific and virtuosic tendencies, which resulted in him recording large amounts of unreleased material.

Prince also wrote songs for other artists, and some songs of his were covered by musicians, such as the hit songs "Manic Monday" (performed by The Bangles), "I Feel For You", originally on Prince's self-titled second album from 1979, covered by Chaka Khan, and "Nothing Compares 2 U", written for Prince's side project the Family, and covered very successfully by Sinead O'Connor. Prince co-wrote "Love... Thy Will Be Done" with singer Martika, for her second album, Martika's Kitchen, and also gifted Celine Dion a song for her second album, Celine Dion, titled "With This Tear"; it was a song Prince had written specifically for her. Prince also wrote "U" for Paula Abdul, appearing on her 1991 release Spellbound.

Equipment 
A guitar virtuoso, Prince was also known to have a stylish and flamboyant custom guitar collection, which consisted of 121 guitars. One notable series is his Cloud Guitars, which were commissioned and released in colored versions of white, yellow and purple. The white version is prominently shown in the Purple Rain film and the "Raspberry Beret" video. Other notable guitars are The Love Symbol guitars, which were designed in the separate colors of gold and purple. The guitar that was used for the majority of Prince's music career was the H.S. Anderson Madcat guitar – a Telecaster copy created by Hohner. Several versions of the guitar were used throughout his career – due to one being donated for charitable reasons, while one or more were stolen. Another guitar that the legendary artist primarily used in his later years was the Vox HDC-77, which was introduced to him by 3rdeyegirl member Ida Kristine Nielsen. Prince utilized both a Blackburst version, and a White Ivory version. Two other noteworthy guitars are the G1 Purple Special, and the black-and-gold Gus G3 Prince bass, which would become the last two guitars to ever be made for him.

Legal issues

Pseudonyms 
In 1993, during negotiations regarding the release of The Gold Experience, a legal battle ensued between Warner Bros. and Prince over the artistic and financial control of his musical output. During the lawsuit, Prince appeared in public with the word "slave" written on his cheek. He explained that he had changed his name to an unpronounceable symbol to emancipate himself from his contract with Warner Bros., and that he had done it out of frustration because he felt his own name now belonged to the company.

Prince sometimes used pseudonyms to separate himself from the music he had written, produced or recorded, and at one point stated that his ownership and achievement were strengthened by the act of giving away ideas. Pseudonyms he adopted, at various times, include: Jamie Starr and The Starr Company (for the songs he wrote for the Time and many other artists from 1981 to 1984), Joey Coco (for many unreleased Prince songs in the late 1980s, as well as songs written for Sheena Easton and Kenny Rogers), Alexander Nevermind (for writing the song "Sugar Walls" (1984) by Sheena Easton), and Christopher (used for his songwriting credit of "Manic Monday" (1986) for the Bangles).

Copyright issues 
On September 14, 2007, Prince announced that he was going to sue YouTube and eBay, because they hosted his copyrighted material, and he hired the international Internet-policing company Web Sheriff. In October, Stephanie Lenz filed a lawsuit against Universal Music Publishing Group claiming that they were abusing copyright law after the music publisher had YouTube take down Lenz's home movie in which the Prince song "Let's Go Crazy" played faintly in the background. On November 5, several Prince fan sites formed "Prince Fans United" to fight back against legal requests which, they claim, Prince made to prevent all use of photographs, images, lyrics, album covers, and anything linked to his likeness. Prince's lawyers claimed that this constituted copyright infringement; the Prince Fans United said that the legal actions were "attempts to stifle all critical commentary about Prince". Prince's promoter AEG stated that the only offending items on the three fansites were live shots from Prince's 21 nights in London at the O2 Arena earlier in the year.

On November 8, Prince Fans United received a song named "PFUnk", providing a kind of "unofficial answer" to their movement. The song originally debuted on the PFU main site, was retitled "F.U.N.K.", but this is not one of the selected songs available on the iTunes Store. On November 14, the satirical website b3ta.com pulled their "image challenge of the week" devoted to Prince after legal threats from the star under the Digital Millennium Copyright Act (DMCA).

At the 2008 Coachella Valley Music and Arts Festival ("Coachella Festival"), Prince performed a cover of Radiohead's "Creep"; however, immediately afterward, he forced YouTube and other sites to remove footage that fans had taken of the performance despite Radiohead's request to leave it on the website. Days later, YouTube reinstated the videos, as Radiohead had said: "It's our song, let people hear it." In 2009, Prince put the video of the Coachella performance on his official website.

In 2010, Prince declared: "the internet is completely over", elaborating five years later that "the internet was over for anyone who wants to get paid... tell me a musician who's got rich off digital sales".

In 2013, the Electronic Frontier Foundation granted to Prince the inaugural "Raspberry Beret Lifetime Aggrievement Award" for what they said was abuse of the DMCA takedown process.

In January 2014, Prince filed a lawsuit titled Prince v. Chodera against 22 online users for direct copyright infringement, unauthorized fixation, contributory copyright infringement, and bootlegging. Several of the users were fans who had shared links to bootlegged versions of Prince concerts through social media websites like Facebook. In the same month, he dismissed the entire action without prejudice.

Prince was one of a small handful of musicians to deny "Weird Al" Yankovic permission to parody his music. By Yankovic's account, he'd done so "about a half-dozen times" and has been the sole artist not to give any explanation for his rejection beyond a flat "no".

Personal life 

Prince was romantically linked with many women over the years, including Kim Basinger, Madonna, Vanity, Jill Jones, Sheila E., Carmen Electra, Susannah Melvoin, and Sherilyn Fenn. Susannah Melvoin recalled how, around the time of Sign o' the Times, "Wendy [Melvoin, her twin sister] and Lisa [Coleman] and I lived together and we would have [Prince] stay at our place. We became really close. He got to be in a family of three women, and we got to have our Prince. Not many people had that kind of relationship with him." In 1990, he saw 16-year-old dancer Mayte García standing outside his tour bus, and referred to her as his "future wife" when pointing her out to bandmate Rosie Gaines. García began working as one of his backup singers and dancers after graduating from high school. They were married on February 14, 1996, when he was 37 and she was 22. They had a son named Amiir (born October 16, 1996), who died a week after being born due to Pfeiffer syndrome. The distress of losing a child and García's subsequent miscarriage took a toll on the marriage, and the couple divorced in 2000. Prince married Manuela Testolini, a Canadian businesswoman of Italian and Egyptian descent, in a private ceremony in 2001; she hails from Toronto, which led the couple to live there part-time. They separated in 2005 and divorced in May 2006. Prince would never marry again, and it is not known that he had more children.

Prince was an animal rights activist who followed a vegan diet for part of his life, but later described himself as vegetarian. He previously adhered to a  pescetarian diet in the 2000s and according to an interview with the Vegetarian Times, Prince first expressed curiosity in removing meat from his diet around 1987 when he ceased eating all red meat. Prince required Paisley Park guests and staff to maintain a vegetarian diet or pescetarian diet while present in order to keep the environment meatless. In honor of Prince’s personal ethos Paisley Park continues to require that individuals leave the premises if they would like to eat meat. The liner notes for his album Rave Un2 the Joy Fantastic (1999) featured a message about the cruelty involved in wool production.

He became a Jehovah's Witness in 2001, following a two-year debate with bassist Larry Graham, who became his mentor and a close friend at this time. He did not consider it a conversion but a "realization", comparing it to Morpheus and Neo in The Matrix (1999). He attended meetings at a local Kingdom Hall and occasionally knocked on people's doors to discuss his faith. Prince had needed double hip replacement surgery since 2005. An unverified rumor was spread by tabloids that he would not undergo the operation because of his religious beliefs, which included a refusal to have blood transfusions. The Star Tribune reported that Graham "denied claims that Prince couldn't have hip surgery because his faith prohibited blood transfusions", stating that "medical technology offers alternatives". Longtime collaborator Jimmy Jam, said that "If he didn't, he was in pain, like, unbelievable (pain), because that's the way Morris felt too", referring to the lead singer of The Time who had hip surgery in 2008, though Jam still could not "believe the stories suggesting Prince may have been dependent on pain pills". While many patients can undergo hip transplant without transfusion, the need for blood is highly individual.

Prince did not speak publicly about his charitable endeavors; the extent of his activism, philanthropy, and charity was publicized after his death. In 2001, he anonymously donated $12,000 to the Louisville Free Public Library system to keep the historic Western Branch Library (the country's first full-service library for African-Americans) from closure. That same year, he anonymously paid off the medical bills of drummer Clyde Stubblefield, who was undergoing cancer treatment. In 2015, he conceived and launched YesWeCode, paying for many hackathons outright and performing musical acts at some of them. He also helped fund the Green for All initiative.

In late March 2016, Prince told an audience he was writing a memoir titled The Beautiful Ones. His cowriter, Dan Piepenbring, continued work on the memoir and The Beautiful Ones was published in October 2019.

Achievements 

Prince sold over 150 million records worldwide, ranking him among the best-selling music artists of all time. He was inducted into the Rock and Roll Hall of Fame in 2004, the UK Music Hall of Fame in 2006, and the Rhythm and Blues Music Hall of Fame in 2016. In 2016, he was posthumously honored with a Doctor of Humane Letters by the University of Minnesota. He was inducted into the Black Music & Entertainment Walk of Fame in 2022.

He has won seven Grammy Awards, seven Brit Awards, six American Music Awards, four MTV Video Music Awards, an Academy Award (for Best Original Song Score for the film Purple Rain), and a Golden Globe Award. Two of his albums, Purple Rain (1984) and Sign o' the Times (1987), received the Grammy Award for Album of the Year nominations. 1999 (1982), Purple Rain and Sign o' the Times have all been inducted into the Grammy Hall of Fame. At the 28th Grammy Awards, Prince was awarded the President's Merit Award. Prince was also honored with the American Music Award for Achievement and American Music Award of Merit at the American Music Awards of 1990 and American Music Awards of 1995 respectively. At the 2013 Billboard Music Awards, he was honored with the Billboard Icon Award. In 2019, the 1984 film Purple Rain was added by the Library of Congress for preservation in the National Film Registry for being "culturally, historically, or aesthetically significant".

Prince has been honored with a star on the outside mural of the Minneapolis nightclub First Avenue, recognizing performers that have played sold-out shows or have otherwise demonstrated a major contribution to the culture at the iconic venue. Receiving a star "might be the most prestigious public honor an artist can receive in Minneapolis," according to journalist Steve Marsh. Prince's backing band, the Revolution, also has a star on the mural, to the immediate right of Prince's. Originally painted silver like the other stars on the mural, Prince's star was repainted in gold leaf during the night of May 4, 2016, about two weeks after Prince's death. Originally anonymous, the artist was revealed a few months later to be graphic designer and graffiti artist Peyton Russell, who had worked for Prince at his club Glam Slam in the 1990s and wanted to pay tribute.

Discography 

* Indicates a deluxe reissue of an album has been released

 For You (1978)
 Prince (1979) 
 Dirty Mind (1980)
 Controversy (1981)
 1999 * (1982)
 Purple Rain * (1984)
 Around the World in a Day (1985)
 Parade (1986)
 Sign o' the Times * (1987)
 Lovesexy (1988)
 Batman (1989)
 Graffiti Bridge (1990)
 Diamonds and Pearls (1991)
 Love Symbol Album (1992)
 Come (1994)
 The Black Album (1994)
 The Gold Experience (1995)
 Chaos and Disorder (1996)
 Emancipation (1996)
 Crystal Ball (1998)
 The Truth (1998)
 The Vault: Old Friends 4 Sale (1999)
 Rave Un2 the Joy Fantastic (1999)
 The Rainbow Children (2001)
 One Nite Alone... (2002)
 Xpectation (2003)
 N·E·W·S (2003)
 The Chocolate Invasion (2004)
 The Slaughterhouse (2004)
 Musicology (2004)
 3121 (2006)
 Planet Earth (2007)
 Lotusflow3r (2009)
 MPLSound (2009)
 20Ten (2010)
 Plectrumelectrum (2014)
 Art Official Age (2014)
 HITnRUN Phase One (2015)
 HITnRUN Phase Two (2015)

Posthumous releases:
 Piano and a Microphone 1983 (2018)
 Originals (2019)
 Welcome 2 America (2021)

Prince also released two albums credited to Madhouse, three albums credited to the New Power Generation, and one credited to the NPG Orchestra:

Madhouse:
 8 (1987)
 16 (1987)

The New Power Generation:
 Goldnigga (1993)
 Exodus (1995)
 Newpower Soul (1998)

NPG Orchestra:
 Kamasutra (1997)

Filmography

Tours 

 Prince Tour (1979–1980)
 Dirty Mind Tour (1980–1981)
 Controversy Tour (1981–1982)
 1999 Tour (1982–1983)
 Purple Rain Tour (1984–1985)
 Parade Tour (1986)
 Sign o' the Times Tour (1987)
 Lovesexy Tour (1988–1989)
 Nude Tour (1990)
 Diamonds and Pearls Tour (1992)
 Act I and II (1993)
 Interactive Tour (1994)
 The Ultimate Live Experience (1995)
 Gold Tour (1996)
 Love 4 One Another Charities Tour (1997)
 Jam of the Year World Tour (1997-1998)
 New Power Soul Tour/Festival (1998)
 Hit n Run Tour (2000–2001)
 A Celebration (2001)
 One Nite Alone... Tour (2002)
 2003–2004 World Tour (2003–2004)
 Musicology Live 2004ever (2004)
 Per4ming Live 3121 (2006–2007)
 Earth Tour (2007)
 20Ten Tour (2010)
 Welcome 2 (2010–2012)
 Live Out Loud Tour (2013)
 Hit and Run Tour (2014–2015)
 Piano & a Microphone Tour (2016)

Books

See also 
 List of best-selling music artists
 List of highest-certified music artists in the United States
 List of dancers
 Unreleased Prince projects
List of artists who reached number one in the United States

Notes

References

Sources

Further reading

External links 

 
 
 [ Prince] at Billboard.com
 Performance at Rock and Roll Hall of Fame at his induction in 2004

 
1958 births
2016 deaths
20th-century African-American male singers
20th-century American drummers
20th-century American guitarists
20th-century American keyboardists
20th-century American male actors
21st-century African-American male singers
21st-century American drummers
21st-century American guitarists
21st-century American keyboardists
Accidental deaths in Minnesota
African-American drummers
African-American film directors
African-American guitarists
African-American male actors
African-American male dancers
African-American male guitarists
African-American male singer-songwriters
African-American pianists
African-American record producers
African-American rock musicians
African-American rock singers
American contemporary R&B singers
American funk bass guitarists
American funk drummers
American funk guitarists
American funk keyboardists
American funk singers
American Jehovah's Witnesses
American male bass guitarists
American male dancers
American male drummers
American male film actors
American male guitarists
American male pianists
American male pop singers
American multi-instrumentalists
American philanthropists
American pop guitarists
American pop keyboardists
American pop pianists
American pop rock singers
American rhythm and blues bass guitarists
American rhythm and blues guitarists
American rhythm and blues keyboardists
American rhythm and blues singers
American rock bass guitarists
American rock drummers
American rock guitarists
American rock keyboardists
American rock pianists
American rock songwriters
American soul guitarists
American soul keyboardists
American soul singers
American tenors
Androgynous people
Arista Records artists
Art pop musicians
Artists from Minneapolis
Best Original Music Score Academy Award winners
Brit Award winners
Burials in Minnesota
Central High School (Minneapolis, Minnesota) alumni
Columbia Records artists
Converts to Jehovah's Witnesses
Countertenors
Culture of Minneapolis
Drug-related deaths in Minnesota
EMI Group artists
Film directors from Minnesota
Golden Globe Award-winning musicians
Grammy Award winners
Guitarists from Minnesota
Keytarists
Las Vegas shows
Lead guitarists
Louisiana Creole people
Male actors from Minneapolis
Male actors from Minnesota
Musicians from Minneapolis
New Power Generation members
Paisley Park Records artists
People from Chanhassen, Minnesota
People with epilepsy
Record producers from Minnesota
Rhythm and blues drummers
Singer-songwriters from Minnesota
Singers with a five-octave vocal range
Soul drummers
The Revolution (band) members
Universal Music Group artists
Warner Records artists